Bona is a town in Sweden located near Motala in Östergötland County.

Populated places in Östergötland County